Ash-Shabibah ('The Youth') was a communist daily newspaper published from Mosul, Iraq. The paper was closed down by the authorities in October 1960 as part of a government clamp-down on the communist press. As of December 1960 there were reports that the editor of ash-Shabibah, Lt. Colonel Ahmad al-Hajj Ayyub, was facing trial for having defended (in an article in ash-Shabibah) the persons convicted by a military court for the Kirkuk events.

References

1960 disestablishments in Iraq
Arabic-language newspapers
Arabic communist newspapers
Communist newspapers published in Iraq
Defunct newspapers published in Iraq
Iraqi Communist Party
Mass media in Mosul
Publications with year of establishment missing
Publications disestablished in 1960